Manfred de Kock (born 3 February 1975) is a South African cricketer. He played in two first-class matches for Boland in 2000/01.

See also
 List of Boland representative cricketers

References

External links
 

1975 births
Living people
South African cricketers
Boland cricketers
Cricketers from Paarl